Ronald Harold Edwards (born July 12, 1979 in Columbus, Ohio) is a former American football defensive tackle. He started 35 consecutive regular season games at nose guard for Texas A&M University, where he recorded 121 tackles with 10 sacks and 23 stops for losses. He was drafted in the 3rd round of the 2001 NFL Draft by the Buffalo Bills. He went to Klein Forest High School in Houston, Texas.

Early life
Edwards played high school football at Klein Forest High School which is located in Houston, Texas. He was named a Super Prep All-American. Edwards also was in the high school's track and field team, winning the 5A state championships in shot put in 1997.  He placed second in the 5A state championships shot put in 1996.

College career
Edwards chose Texas A&M as his alma mater.

References

External links
NFL Player's Association Bio Page

1979 births
Living people
Players of American football from Columbus, Ohio
Players of American football from Houston
American football defensive tackles
Texas A&M Aggies football players
Buffalo Bills players
Kansas City Chiefs players
Carolina Panthers players
Ed Block Courage Award recipients